Metaweb was a web infrastructure company that was acquired by Google in 2010.

Metaweb may also refer to:
 The Metaweb, a site for book annotations and essays associated with Neal Stephenson's Baroque Cycle

See also
 MetaWeblog, API an application programming interface